Hólmbert Aron Friðjónsson (born 19 April 1993) is an Icelandic professional footballer who plays as a striker for German  club Holstein Kiel.

Club career
In July 2011 Hólmbert transferred to Fram Reykjavík after making his mark as a young player with HK in the Icelandic second tier.

Keflavík-born Hólmbert emerged as a stand out player during the 2013 season and his 10 goals were crucial to help Fram Reykjavík avoid relegation from the Icelandic top league.  The player also scored three times for the team in the Icelandic Cup, which helped them win the competition for the first time in 24 years. Hólmbert scored Fram's first goal in the Cup final, a 3–3 draw with Stjarnan, then converted his kick as Fram won on a penalty shootout, in a game that he described as "the highlight of my career".

After trials in the Netherlands with Heracles and in Scotland with Celtic, Hólmbert signed a four-year deal to join the Glasgow giants, for a fee of around £100,000. Although officially signing for the team on 1 January 2014 for the next transfer window, the player started training with his new club at the beginning of December 2013. Hólmbert made the decision to join the Scottish club after speaking to teammates Steven Lennon and Alan Lowing who both played previously in the Scottish Premiership.

Hólmbert joined Danish Superliga club Brøndby on loan in September 2014, after failing to feature in any competitive games for Celtic. During the loan, Hólmbert made eleven league appearances, scoring one goal. After returning to Celtic, he was released on 2 July 2015 without ever making a first team appearance. The same day, it was announced that he was returning to Iceland to play for KR Reykjavík on a 2.5-year contract. On 1 August 2016, he signed for Stjarnan on a loan deal for the remainder of the season. He then made the move permanent after the season.

On 5 October 2020, he joined Italian club Brescia.

In June 2021 it was announced Hólmbert would join 2. Bundesliga side Holstein Kiel for the 2021–22 season. In the first half of the season, he struggled with injuries and played just 82 minutes.

In January 2022 Hólmbert moved to Eliteserien club Lillestrøm SK on loan until the end of the year.

International career
Hólmbert received his first call-up for the Iceland national team on 16 January 2015 in a friendly against Canada. He scored his first goal on 19 January 2015 in their return friendly against Canada.

Career statistics

Club

International
Scores and results list Iceland's goal tally first, score column indicates score after each Hólmbert goal.

References

External links

1993 births
Living people
Association football forwards
Holmbert Fridjonsson
Holmbert Fridjonsson
Holmbert Fridjonsson
Holmbert Fridjonsson
Holmbert Fridjonsson
Holmbert Fridjonsson
Holmbert Fridjonsson
Brøndby IF players
Holmbert Fridjonsson
Holmbert Fridjonsson
Aalesunds FK players
Brescia Calcio players
Holstein Kiel players
Lillestrøm SK players
Holmbert Fridjonsson
Danish Superliga players
Eliteserien players
2. Bundesliga players
Holmbert Fridjonsson
Holmbert Fridjonsson
Expatriate footballers in Scotland
Holmbert Fridjonsson
Expatriate men's footballers in Denmark
Holmbert Fridjonsson
Expatriate footballers in Italy
Holmbert Fridjonsson
Expatriate footballers in Norway
Holmbert Fridjonsson
Expatriate footballers in Germany